Steven Sloane (born 1958) is an Israeli-American conductor.

Biography
Born in Los Angeles, California, Sloane developed an interest in conducting at age 16.  He graduated from the University of California, Los Angeles with a degree in music.  Separately, he also took conducting lessons with Eugene Ormandy, Franco Ferrara and Gary Bertini.  Sloane lived and worked for much of the 1980s in Israel.

From 1989 to 1994, Sloane was First Kapellmeister at the Frankfurt Opera.  He was music director of the Bochum Symphony Orchestra (Bochumer Symphoniker) from 1994 to 2021.  Simultaneously with his Bochum tenure, Sloane was Music Director of Opera North from 1999 to 2002, and was principal conductor of the Stavanger Symphony Orchestra from 2007 to 2013.  In June 2018, the Bochumer Symphoniker announced that Sloane is to conclude his tenure as its Generalmusikdirektor (GMD) at the close of the 2020–2021 season.

In the US, Sloane was music director of the Spoleto Festival USA from 1996 to 2000.  In November 2000, Sloane was named music director of the American Composers Orchestra, effective with the 2002–2003 season.  This appointment was unusual in that Sloane had never conducted the orchestra prior to his appointment, although he did meet several of the orchestra's musicians during their music director search prior to his appointment.  Sloane did not conduct the orchestra for the first time until March 2002.  He formally began his tenure with the orchestra in November 2002., and concluded his tenure with the orchestra in 2006.

In February 2019, the Jerusalem Symphony Orchestra announced the appointment of Sloane as its next music director, effective with the 2019–2020 season.

Sloane was married to the violist Tabea Zimmermann.  The couple have a daughter, Maya, born in 2003.

References

External links
 
 Karsten Witt agency page on Steven Sloane
 Opus 3 Artists agency page on Steven Sloane
 'Steven Sloane blir ny sjefdirigent i Stavanger', Norsk musikkinformasjon, 23 May 2006

1958 births
Living people
American male conductors (music)
Music directors (opera)
Opera North
21st-century American conductors (music)
21st-century American male musicians
20th-century American conductors (music)
20th-century American male musicians
Musicians from Los Angeles
Classical musicians from California